Mohammad Reza Roudaki (born February 22, 1984, in Shiraz) was an Iranian judoka.

He won a silver medal at the +100 kg category of the 2006 Asian Games.

External links
 
 
 
 profile

1984 births
Living people
Iranian male judoka
Judoka at the 2008 Summer Olympics
Judoka at the 2012 Summer Olympics
Olympic judoka of Iran
Place of birth missing (living people)
Asian Games silver medalists for Iran
Asian Games bronze medalists for Iran
Asian Games medalists in judo
Judoka at the 2006 Asian Games
Judoka at the 2010 Asian Games
Medalists at the 2006 Asian Games
Medalists at the 2010 Asian Games
People from Shiraz
Sportspeople from Fars province
21st-century Iranian people